Hattie Catherine Allen Derr (September 20, 1905 – October 31, 1994) was an American politician.

From Clark Fork, Idaho and a student at the University of Idaho, Derr served briefly in the Idaho State Senate when her husband Alfred M. Derr was ill. Her son was Allen Derr who was a lawyer.

Notes

1905 births
1994 deaths
People from Bonner County, Idaho
University of Idaho alumni
Women state legislators in Idaho
Democratic Party Idaho state senators
20th-century American politicians
20th-century American women politicians